The Hepburn Football Netball Club, nicknamed the Burras, is an Australian rules football and netball club that plays in the town of Hepburn Springs, Victoria and plays in the Central Highlands Football League. The colours of the club are red and blue.

Club history 
Football in the Victorian town of Hepburn Springs dates back to the 1860s and a team was fielded in 1864 but it wasn't until approximately 1919, after World War I, that the Hepburn Football Club was officially founded and represented the town in an organised competition. Hepburn played in the Daylesford District Junior Football Association in which the Burras compiled a successful history, claiming premierships in 1930, 1934, 1938 and 1939. After World War II, Hepburn moved to the Clunes Football Association and was rather unsuccessful in the league, the closest to adding to the flag haul was the 1949 grand final, losing to the Newlyn Football Club by 31 points.

In 1979, the Clunes Football League and the Ballarat Bacchus Marsh Football League amalgamated to form the Central Highlands Football League and Hepburn were one of the founding members of the new competition. After first contesting the finals in 1985, the Burras improved and went on to win a CHFL record-breaking nine senior premierships, the most recent being in 2017 at Mars Stadium when they beat minor premiers Beaufort 15.15.105 to 13.9.87. The club celebrated its 150th anniversary in 2014.

A-Grade Premierships 
 Daylesford District Football Association - 1930, 1934, 1938, 1939
 Central Highlands Football League - 1985, 1986, 1989, 2004, 2005, 2008, 2010, 2013, 2017

Book
 History of Football in the Ballarat District by John Stoward -

References

External links 
 
 Club profile on AFL National

Australian rules football clubs in Victoria (Australia)
1919 establishments in Australia
Australian rules football clubs established in 1919